Adinarayana Rao may refer to:
 Sunkara Venkata Adinarayana Rao (born 1939), an Indian orthopaedic surgeon
 P. Adinarayana Rao (1915–1991), a Telugu film music composer, and producer